The Dahlem Cemetery (sometimes improperly referred to as Friedhof Dahlem-Dorf), is a cemetery in Berlin-Dahlem. The cemetery was built according to the plans of the architects Friedrich and Wilhelm Hennigs.

Notable burials
 Ernst Otto Beckmann (1853–1923), chemist
 Paul Bildt (1885–1957), film actor
 Emil Bohnke (1888–1928), violist, composer and conductor
 Klaus Croissant (1931–2002), lawyer
 Hermann Diels (1848–1922)
 Heinz Drache (1923–2002)
 Wilhelm Fliess (1858–1928)
 August Gaul (1869–1921)
 Waldemar Grzimek (1918–1984)
 Clemens Hasse (1908–1959)
 Rudolf Havenstein (1857–1923)
 Bernhard Heiliger (1915–1995)
 Fritz Heinemann (1864–1932)
 Werner Hinz (1903–1985)
 Jacobus Henricus van 't Hoff (1852–1911), Dutch physical and organic chemist and Nobel laureate
 Lucie Höflich (1883–1956)
 Ludwig Knaus (1829–1910)
 Albert von Le Coq (1860–1930)
 Lilli Lehmann (1848–1929), opera singer
 Ernst Lindemann (1894–1941), Navy sea captain (cenotaph)
 Friedrich Meinecke (1862–1954), historian
 Rotraut Richter (1915–1947), actress
 Edgar Speyer (1862–1932), financier and philanthropist
 Otto Heinrich Warburg (1883–1970), physiologist, medical doctor and Nobel laureate
 Rainer Zepperitz (1930–2009)

References 
 Hans-Jürgen Mende, Debora Paffen: Friedhof Dahlem und St.-Annen-Kirchhof – Ein Friedhofsführer. Christian Simon Verlag Edition Luisenstadt, Berlin 2007, .

External links

 
 

Cemeteries in Berlin